Neostatherotis is a genus of moths belonging to the subfamily Olethreutinae of the family Tortricidae.

Species
Neostatherotis nipponica Oku, 1974
Neostatherotis pallidtornus Razowski, 2008
Neostatherotis vietnamica Razowski, 2008

See also
List of Tortricidae genera

References

External links
tortricidae.com

Olethreutini
Tortricidae genera